is a village located in Nagano Prefecture, Japan. , the village had an estimated population of 1,057 in 430 households, and a population density of 16 persons per km².

Geography
Minamiaiki is located in mountainous eastern Nagano Prefecture, bordered by Gunma Prefecture to the east. More than 90% of the village area is covered by mountains and forest, and the village is at an average altitude of between 1000 and 1200 meters.  Minamiaiki Dam is located within this village.

Surrounding municipalities
 Nagano Prefecture
 Kitaaiki
 Koumi
 Minamimaki
 Kawakami
 Gunma Prefecture
 Ueno

Climate
The village has a humid continental climate characterized by warm and humid summers, and cold winters (Köppen climate classification Dfb).  The average annual temperature in Minamiaiki is 7.4 °C. The average annual rainfall is 1537 mm with September as the wettest month. The temperatures are highest on average in August, at around 20.1 °C, and lowest in January, at around -4.7 °C.

Demographics
Per Japanese census data, the population of Minamiaiki has declined by more than half since its peak around 1950.

History
The area of present-day Minamiaiki was part of ancient Shinano Province, and was mentioned in Muromachi period records. The area was part of the tenryō territories under the direct administration of the Tokugawa shogunate during the Edo period. The present village of Minamiaiki was created with the establishment of the modern municipalities system on April 1, 1889.

Education
Minamiaiki has one public elementary school operated by the village government. The village shares a public middle school with neighboring Kitaaika. The village does not have a high school.

Transportation

Railway
The village does not have any passenger rail service.

Highway
The village is not served by any national highways.

References

External links

Official Website 

 
Villages in Nagano Prefecture